Dublin railway station may refer to:
 Dublin Connolly railway station in Dublin, Ireland
 Dublin Pearse railway station in Dublin, Ireland
 Dublin Heuston railway station in Dublin, Ireland
 Broadstone railway station
 Harcourt Street railway station